Fujiigawa Dam  is a gravity dam located in Ibaraki Prefecture in Japan. The dam is used for flood control, irrigation and water supply. The catchment area of the dam is 70 km2. The dam impounds about 38  ha of land when full and can store 4462 thousand cubic meters of water. The construction of the dam was started on 1991 and completed in 2009.

See also
List of dams in Japan

References

Dams in Ibaraki Prefecture